Hypsodont is a pattern of dentition  with high-crowned teeth and enamel extending past the gum line, providing extra material for wear and tear. Some examples of animals with hypsodont dentition are cows and horses; all animals that feed on gritty, fibrous material. The opposite condition is called brachydont.

Evolution
Since the morphology of the hypsodont tooth is suited to a more abrasive diet, hypsodonty was thought to have evolved concurrently with the spread of grasslands.  Grass contains phytoliths, silica-rich granules, which wear away dental tissue more quickly. Analysis has shown however, that the development of this morphology is out of sync with the flourishing of grasslands. Instead, the ingestion of grit and soil is hypothesized to be the primary driver of hypsodonty (the Grit, not grass hypothesis).

Morphology
Hypsodont dentition is characterized by:

 high-crowned teeth
 A rough, flattish occlusal surface adapted for crushing and grinding
 Cementum both above and below the gingival line
 Enamel which covers the entire length of the body and likewise extends past the gum line
 The cementum and the enamel invaginate into the thick layer of dentin

A mammal may have exclusively hypsodont molars or have a mix of dentitions.

Examples
Hypsodonty is observed both in the fossil record and the modern world. It is a characteristic of large clades (equids) as well as subspecies level specialization. For example, the Sumatran rhinoceros and the Javan rhinoceros both have brachydont, lophodont cheek teeth whereas the Indian rhinoceros has hypsodont dentition.

Examples of extant animals with hypsodont dentition include:
 Cows
 Horses
 Deer

At least two lineages of allotheres, Taeniolabidoidea and Gondwanatheria, developed hypsodont teeth, the latter being probably among the first mammals to be able to process grass.

See also
Brachydont
Lophodont
Dental formula
Polyphyodont

External links
The Diversity of Cheek Teeth

References

Dentition types
Veterinary dentistry